Viva Spider-Man is a student film and Spider-Man fan film created in 1980 based on the animated series Spider-Man from 1967. It is based on the episodes "King Pinned" and "Criminals in the Clouds". The film's creator, Jim Kreig would later go on to be a writer for Spider-Man: The Animated Series.

Plot
The film begins in a diner where Peter Parker and a female friend, Susan, are talking. Susan sees a basketball player from their high school, Roy Robinson, whom she says she likes. Peter gets upset at this and starts saying bad things about him, and Susan storms off. Peter begins to daydream about by Susan, and becoming better than Robinson. He decides to go to his gym coach to get on the school basketball team to impress to Susan, figuring his secret spider-like powers will make him a star player, but the coach refuses to give him a tryout, saying the team roster is full but offering Peter the role of waterboy.

Later that night, two criminals breaks into Robinson house and kidnaps him while he sleeps. Meanwhile, at the Daily Bugle, Peter overhears a conversation between J. Jonah Jameson and Wilson Fisk (Kingpin) where he tells Jameson to come to him, Peter dons his Spider-Man suit and swings to the Kingpin's office.

Kingpin threatens Jameson, that if he doesn't retract what he writes in his papers Robinson will be killed. Spider-Man then beats up the criminals who kidnaped Robinson but gets knocked out by the Kingpin. When he awakens he defeats the Kingpin, who triggers a time-bomb attached to Robinson in the Acme Warehouse across town. Spider-Man chooses to let the Kingpin escape in order to race to save Robinson from the bomb, then bring him to his basketball match. Robinson thanks Spider-Man but says that his arms are too numb from captivity to shoot the ball properly, so Spider-Man decides to help him out by discreetly firing his webbing at Robinson's final three-point shot to propel it into the net. Robinson's victory impresses Susan and she goes out with him, while Peter is berated by the basketball coach for seemingly not attending the game and missing his school's big win.

Peter later contemplates his bad luck, despite the fact that when he is Spider-Man, he is the world's greatest hero.

Cast
James Krieg as Peter Parker 
Captain Haggerty as Kingpin
Ray Sutton as J. Jonah Jameson
Thomas Wherle as Roy Robinson
Joan Passanto as Susan
Roswell Smith as Coach
Greg Spence/Mark Weeks/Sven Davison/Jeremy Rodgers/Jack Douglass/David Fogg as Spiderman

See also
 Spider-Man, a 1969 fan film
 Spider-Man Versus Kraven the Hunter, a 1974 fan film
 The Green Goblin's Last Stand, a 1992 fan film
 Spider-Man Lives: A Miles Morales Story, a 2015 fan film

References

External links
 Viva Spider-Man, on YouTube

Spider-Man fan films
American student films
Short films based on Marvel Comics
1980s English-language films
1980s American films